Sebastián Ricardo Martín-Retortillo Baquer (7 February 1931 – 19 October 2002) was a Spanish politician from the Union of the Democratic Centre (UCD) who served as Deputy Minister to the Prime Minister, Responsible for Public Administration from May 1980 to February 1981.

References

1931 births
2002 deaths
University of Zaragoza alumni
Government ministers of Spain
20th-century Spanish politicians